Area codes 315 and 680 are telephone area codes of the North American Numbering Plan (NANP) for the north-central area of the U.S. state of New York. Area code 315 was installed as one of the original North American area codes in 1947, while area code 680 was added to the numbering plan area (NPA) in an overlay plan in 2017.

The service area extends from the western side of Wayne County to Little Falls, north to the Canada–United States border, east to Massena and south to near Cortland.  Most of the area's population lives in Syracuse and its suburbs.  Other major population areas include Utica and Watertown.

History
Area code 315 was one of the original North American area codes created in 1947, when it was assigned to a numbering plan area (NPA) in central New York state that extended from the Canadian border with Ontario and Quebec southward to the Pennsylvania state line, including Binghamton and Syracuse. During 1954, its southern portion, including Binghamton, was combined with the southeastern corner of numbering plan area 716 in an area code split that created area code 607.

New York State regulators announced that 315 was threatened by numbering exhaustion for the third quarter of 2010. The New York State Public Service Commission at the time weighed two options, an overlay plan or a split plan. A numbering plan area division would have included a north-south arrangement, dividing Oswego County and the north from 315, or an east-west division, with Oswego and Onondaga forming the boundary. Regulators met to discuss a second code in the 315 region. Due to economic conditions, assignable numbers were not depleted during the third quarter of 2010 as projected. The revised exhaustion was estimated for 2017. On March 11, 2017, area code 680 was introduced, creating the first overlay in the upstate region.

Since 2017, telephone callers must dial ten digits for local calls for using most telephone services including Verizon and Charter Spectrum. Attempts to make a seven-digit call with these services activates an intercept message reminding them of the new rule. As of January 12, 2021, there were still some smaller phone services whose customers were still able to use seven digit dialing within area code 315 and connect to the person they were dialing.

As of 2020, very few if any numbers in the 680 area code were in use.

On March 15, 2022, a proclamation by Syracuse Mayor Ben Walsh and Onondaga County Executive Ryan McMahon declared recognition of '315 day'.

Service area

Counties

Cayuga
Chenango
Cortland
Fulton
Hamilton
Herkimer
Jefferson
Lewis
Madison
Oneida
Onondaga
Ontario
Oswego
Otsego
Saint Lawrence
Seneca
Wayne
Yates

Cities, towns, villages, and hamlets

Adams Center
Adams
Alder Creek
Alexandria Bay
Altmar
Alton
Annsville
Antwerp
Apulia Station
Auburn
Aurora
Ava
Baldwinsville
Barneveld
Beaver Falls
Belleville
Bernhards Bay
Black River
Blossvale
Boonville
Bouckville
Branchport
Brantingham
Brasher Falls
Brewerton
Bridgeport
Bridgewater
Brier Hill
Brookfield
Brownville
Calcium
Camden
Camillus
Canastota
Canton
Cape Vincent
Carthage
Cassville
Castorland
Cato
Cayuga
Cazenovia
Central Square
Chadwicks
Chase Mills
Chaumont
Chippewa Bay
Chittenango
Cicero  
Clark Mills
Clay
Clayton 
Clayville  
Cleveland
Clifton Springs  
Clinton 
Clockville 
Clyde
Cold Brook 
Colton
Constableville 
Constantia 
Copenhagen 
Cranberry Lake  
Croghan 
De Kalb Junction
De Peyster  
DeRuyter 
Deansboro 
Deer River 
Deferiet 
Delphi Falls  
Dewitt
Denmark 
Depauville
Dexter  
Dolgeville
Dresden
Durhamville
Eagle Bay  
Earlville 
East Syracuse
East Williamson  
Eaton 
Edwards
Elbridge
Ellisburg  
Erieville  
Evans Mills
Fabius 
Fair Haven 
Fayette 
Fayetteville  
Felts Mills 
Fine 
Fishers Landing
Forestport  
Fort Drum 
Frankfort  
Franklin Springs 
Fulton 
Geneva
Genoa 
Georgetown  
Glenfield  
Gouverneur 
Great Bend  
Greig 
Hailesboro 
Hamilton  
Hammond 
Hannawa Falls 
Hannibal 
Harrisville  
Hastings
Helena
Henderson Harbor
Henderson 
Herkimer  
Hermon 
Heuvelton
Hinckley  
Hoffmeister 
Holland Patent 
Hubbardsville  
Ilion  
Inlet 
Jamesville 
Jordan 
Jordanville 
Keuka Park  
King Ferry
Kirkville
Knoxboro
La Fargeville
La Fayette 
Lacona
Lawrence
Lee Center  
Leonardsville
Limerick
Lisbon
Little Falls
Liverpool
Locke  
Lorraine  
Lowville  
Lycoming 
Lyons Falls 
Lyons  
Madison
Madrid
Mallory
Manlius
Mannsville
Maple View
Marcellus
Marcy
Marietta
Marion
Martinsburg
Martville
Massena
McConnellsville
Memphis
Meridian
Mexico
Middleville
Minetto
Minoa
Mohawk
Montezuma
Moravia 
Morristown
Morrisville
Mottville
Munnsville
Natural Bridge
Nedrow 
New Hartford
New Haven
New Woodstock
New York Mills 
Newark  
Newport 
Newton Falls 
Nicholville 
Norfolk  
North Bay
North Brookfield 
North Lawrence
North Pitcher
North Rose  
Norwood
Oaks Corners
Ogdensburg
Old Forge
Oneida
Ontario Center 
Ontario
Oriskany 
Oriskany Falls  
Orwell 
Oswegatchie 
Oswego
Oxbow
Palmyra
Parish
Parishville  
Penn Yan 
Pennellville
Peterboro
Phelps 
Philadelphia  
Phoenix  
Pierrepont Manor 
Plainville 
Plessis  
Poland 
Pompey 
Poplar Ridge
Port Byron 
Port Gibson
Port Leyden 
Potsdam
Preble 
Prospect 
Pulaski
Pultneyville 
Pyrites
Raquette Lake  
Raymondville
Red Creek  
Redfield 
Redwood 
Remsen
Rensselaer Falls 
Richfield Springs 
Richland 
Richville 
Rodman
Rome  
Romulus  
Rooseveltown 
Rose  
Russell
Sackets Harbor 
Salisbury Center
Sandy Creek 
Sangerfield
Sauquoit  
Savannah 
Schuyler Lake
Scipio Center  
Seneca Castle 
Seneca Falls 
Sherrill 
Skaneateles Falls 
Skaneateles 
Sodus 
Sodus Point  
Solsville
Solvay  
South Butler 
South Colton
South Otselic
Springfield Center  
Star Lake 
Sterling
Stittville 
Stratford
Sylvan Beach 
Syracuse
Taberg
Thendara 
Theresa 
Thousand Island Park 
Three Mile Bay 
Tully 
Turin
Union Springs 
Utica
Van Hornesville 
Vernon Center 
Vernon 
Verona Beach 
Verona 
Waddington
Walworth
Wampsville
Wanakena  
Warners 
Washington Mills
Waterloo  
Watertown
Waterville
Weedsport  
Wellesley Island
West Eaton 
West Edmeston
West Leyden  
West Monroe
West Stockholm  
West Winfield 
Westdale 
Westernville
Westmoreland  
Whitesboro 
Williamson
Williamstown 
Winthrop
Wolcott 
Woodgate 
Yorkville

See also
 List of New York area codes
 List of NANP area codes

References

External links

 List of exchanges from AreaCodeDownload.com, 315 Area Code

Telecommunications-related introductions in 1947
315
315